Haugen Hill was a ski jumping hill in Dillon, Colorado. Owned by Dillon Ski Club, it had a K-point at 60 meters.

History
Haugen Hill was constructed by Peter Prestrud, Eyvin Flood, and Anders Haugen, and it was opened on March 8, 1918. Haugen Hill is no longer in use. Two world records in ski jumping were set at Haugen Hill.

Ski jumping world records

External links
 Haugen Hill at skisprungschanzen.com

  

Geography of Summit County, Colorado
Sports venues in Colorado
Ski areas and resorts in Colorado